Washington Summit may refer to:

Washington Summit (1973)
Washington Summit (1987)
Washington Summit (1990)